Tomaso Montanari (born 15 October 1971) is an Italian art historian, academic and essayist.

Life
He was born in Florence and there attended the liceo classico Dante, before graduating from the University of Pisa and studying alongside Paola Barocchi at the Scuola Normale Superiore di Pisa. He became ordinary professor of Modern Art History at the Università per Stranieri di Siena before teaching at the Università della Tuscia, the Università degli Studi di Roma Tor Vergata and the Università degli Studi di Napoli Federico II.

He is notable as one of the most authoritative authors on western Baroque art, on which he has written over one hundred essays in scholarly reviews and for noted publishers. He is president of the Comitato tecnico scientifico per le Belle Arti (technical scientific committee for fine arts) in Italy's Ministry of Cultural Heritage and Activities, and is thus also ex officio a member of the Consiglio Universitario Nazionale. He is also a member of the Uffizi's scientific committee, the editorial panel of the review Prospettiva and the jury for the Premio Sila.

He writes for the Il Fatto Quotidiano and the 'Ora d'Arte' column for the Il Venerdì di Repubblica. He considers himself a "radical Catholic", influenced by the ideas of Lorenzo Milani.

Journalism

Newspapers 
 Corriere Fiorentino (until 2013);
 Corriere del Mezzogiorno (2013-2014);
 la Repubblica (2014-2018);
 HuffPost Italia (2015-2018);
 Il Fatto Quotidiano (dal 2018);

Magazines 
 Il Venerdì di Repubblica (dal 2014); 
 MicroMega (dal 2013);
Altreconomia (dal 2016).

Books

Editor

Prefaces and postscripts

TV
 La libertà di Bernini, 8 episodes aired from 7 January 2015 on Rai5, directed by Luca Criscenti
 La vera natura di Caravaggio, 12 episodes aired from 16 December 2016 in onda su Rai5, directed by Luca Criscenti 
 I silenzi di Vermeer, 4 episodes aired from 21 dicembre 2018 on Rai5, directed by Luca Criscenti
 Favole forme figure, 12 ten-minute episodes on Italian masterpieces on the Loft slot on Il Fatto Quotidiano, from 29 October 2018
 Velázquez. L'ombra della vita, 4 episodes aired from 8 February 2019 on Rai5, directed by Luca Criscenti
 Eretici, ten episodes of biographies (Tina Anselmi, Hannah Arendt, Francesco Borromini, Piero Calamandrei, Danilo Dolci, Papa Francesco, Giorgio La Pira, Don Milani, Socrate, Paolo Veronese) on the Loft slot on Il Fatto Quotidiano, dal 28 febbraio 2019
 Gli abissi di Tiepolo, aired from 27 March 2020 on Rai5, directed by Luca Criscenti

References 

Italian bloggers
Male bloggers
University of Pisa alumni
Scuola Normale Superiore di Pisa alumni
Writers from Florence
Baroque art
Living people
1971 births
Italian television presenters
Italian essayists
Male essayists
Italian art historians
Italian Roman Catholics
Academic staff of Tuscia University
Academic staff of the University of Rome Tor Vergata
Academic staff of the University of Naples Federico II
Italian male non-fiction writers
Mass media people from Florence